Isabella Wallhead (born 15 February 2003) is an Australian soccer player who plays for the Heidelberg United SC in the National Premier Leagues Victoria Women.

Playing career
Wallhead grew up in Perth and attended Seton Catholic College. Wallhead played youth football at Cockburn City.

In 2018, Wallhead was selected for the Australian under-17 national team. She played at the 2019 AFC under 16 Women's Championship in Thailand, where she was one of 5 West Australians in the squad and scored 2 goals in the qualifying match against Palestine in an 11–0 victory. Australia lost in the semi-finals and failed to qualify for the world cup.

Wallhead was selected for the Perth Glory squad for the 2019–20 W-League season, and made her debut against Adelaide United on 3 January 2020, replacing Natasha Rigby for the second half. In December 2020, Wallhead re-signed with Perth Glory ahead of the 2020–21 W-League season. In June 2021, Wallhead re-signed with Perth Glory once more, ahead of the 2021–22 W-League season.

References 

Living people
2003 births
Australian women's soccer players
Perth Glory FC (A-League Women) players
Australian rules footballers from Perth, Western Australia
A-League Women players
Women's association footballers not categorized by position